Coatbridge, Chryston and Bellshill is a constituency of the House of Commons of the Parliament of the United Kingdom. It elects one Member of Parliament (MP) using the first-past-the-post voting system.

It was created for the 2005 general election, covering the whole area of the Coatbridge and Chryston constituency and parts of the Hamilton North and Bellshill seat. A small area in the eastern side of Coatbridge lies within the Airdrie and Shotts constituency. Traditionally, the area served by the seat and its predecessors was the safest Labour area in Scotland. Its previous MP was Hugh Gaffney of the Labour Party who gained the seat at the 2017 general election, succeeding SNP MP Phil Boswell who had held the seat since the SNP landslide victory in 2015. It was retaken by the SNP's Steven Bonnar at the 2019 general election.

Boundaries

The constituency covers the west of the North Lanarkshire council area, and is predominantly urban. Coatbridge lies in the south of the seat, with the urban/rural mix to the north extending in the eastern and western directions following the directions of commuter rail-lines.

The constituency is formed by the following electoral divisions:

In full: Gartcosh, Glenboig and Moodiesburn, Stepps, Chryston and Muirhead, Coatbridge South, Coatbridge West, Thorniewood.
In part: Bellshill, Cumbernauld North, Mossend and Holytown.

Members of Parliament
Tom Clarke of the Scottish Labour held this seat from its creation in 2005, having previously represented the predecessor constituencies of Monklands West and Coatbridge & Chryston since 1982. Clarke lost his seat to Phil Boswell of the Scottish National Party in 2015 with Boswell then losing his seat two years later to Hugh Gaffney of the Labour Party. In 2019 the SNP regained the seat with Steven Bonnar winning over Hugh Gaffney with a majority of 5,642 votes.

Election results

Elections in the 2010s

Elections in the 2000s

Notes

References

Westminster Parliamentary constituencies in Scotland
Politics of North Lanarkshire
Constituencies of the Parliament of the United Kingdom established in 2005
Bellshill
Coatbridge